The Argentina women's national team are a rugby league team represent Argentina internationally. They played their first international against Brazil in 2018, losing 48-0.

Results

References

Women's national rugby league teams
Women's national sports teams of Argentina